Jessica Kirson is an American stand-up comedian and producer.  Kirson performs regularly at some of the most renowned comedy venues in New York City — some of which include: Gotham Comedy Club, Laugh Factory, Caroline's, and the Improv.

Early Life
Kirson is a native of South Orange, New Jersey. Kirson attended Columbia High School. She described herself as a 'major class clown' who loved to make people laugh. Kirson is the stepsister of both actor Zach Braff, and writer Joshua Braff. With the intention of becoming a therapist, Kirson graduated from the University of Maryland in family studies and from New York University with a Masters of Social Work. She describes her studies as 'very helpful' to her crowd work and the business 'because a lot of those people are crazy'. After her university studies, Kirson turned to comedy, creating material and testing it out weekly in a class setting. She participated in open mics in New York in different venues. Over this time she worked as a bartender at Houlihan's at Times Square and at an Upper West Side restaurant.

Career
Kirson made her career debut in the film, School Dance. Her one-hour special Talking to Myself debuted on Comedy Central was executive produced by Bill Burr. Other projects include her series The Call Girls with longtime friend and comedian Rachel Feinstein. Kirson has performed on The Tonight Show, The Tonight Show with Jay Leno, The View, and Kevin Can Wait. Kirson acted in and served as a consultant, producer, and writer on the Robert De Niro film The Comedian. Kirson also hosts her own podcast, Disgusting Hawk. Jessica is also a contributor on The Howard Stern Show, where she produces and stars in prank calls for the program. Kirson was an executive producer of and main organizer behind the documentary Hysterican which follows a group of ground-breaking female comedians in their lives, on and off stage. Kirson also appeared in the film as herself. Kirson's style is self-deprecating, less 'punch type' and very character based. She often talks about her experience as a lesbian and as a Jew.

Filmography

Film

Television

References

External links

21st-century LGBT people
Gay comedians
Living people